John Frederick  Williams (9 March 1907 – 1 September 1983) was a Welsh Anglican priest in the last third of the twentieth century. Williams was educated at Friars School, Bangor, and the University of Wales; and ordained in 1930. After curacies in Portmadoc and Aberdare he served incumbencies at Miskin, Skewen and Neath. He was Archdeacon of Llandaff from  1969 to 1971; and Dean of Llandaff from 1971 to 1977.

References

1907 births
1983 deaths
Alumni of the University of Wales
Archdeacons of Llandaff
Deans of Llandaff
People educated at Friars School, Bangor
People from Bangor, Gwynedd